Camille Saint-Saëns's Barcarolle in F major, Op. 108 is a chamber composition for a quartet consisting of violin, cello, harmonium (or organ) and piano. Composed in 1898, the work also exists in a version for violin, cello, viola and piano created by the composer in 1909.

Background
The Barcarolle was Saint-Saëns's second attempt at composing for this combination of instruments, with an 1897 attempt being abandoned after five and a half pages. In 1865 he had composed the Serenade Op. 15 for a similar combination with a viola rather than a cello as the fourth instrument.

The work is dedicated to Antonio Jeanbernat, who initiated two festivals of Saint-Saëns' works in Barcelona.

Structure
The composition is structured as a single movement marked Allegretto moderato. Performance time is around 8 to 10 minutes.

References
Notes

Sources

External links

Chamber music by Camille Saint-Saëns
Compositions for piano quartet
Compositions for organ
1898 compositions
Compositions in F major
Music with dedications